Candida is a small town and comune (municipality) in the province of Avellino within the Campania region of Italy.

The economy is based mainly on agriculture.

History 

The first human settlements in the territory date back to the Roman times. Many ruins have been found in the localities of Cesine, Vigna, Selvetelle, Scandravoli, Giardino, Ponticelli, Gaudi, Toppa S. Andrea. The name of the town derives from the Latin "locus candidus" which means clear, shining place.

The first historical mention of the town appeared in 1045 when Candida was included, under the Lombard domination, in the Avellino county. From that time many feudal lords followed one another. The Filangieri family owned the fiefdom from 1187 with Alduino de Candida, until 1420 when Caterina Filangieri de Candida gave the fiefdom of Candida as a dowry to Sergianni Caracciolo. Then the fiefdom passed to the De Cardona, Magnacervo, Grimaldi, Saulli families back to the Caracciolos that kept it until the abolition of the feudal system.

Main sights

Church of SS. Trinità (monastery of Sant'Agostino), originally in Gothic style. It was rebuilt in Renaissance style after 1550.
Monastery and church of Montevergine, built in the 15th century.
Collegiata Church (1540).
Remains of the Lombard castle

References

Cities and towns in Campania